The Hasbaya District is a district in the Nabatiyeh Governorate of Lebanon. It lies in the southeast, bordering Syria. The capital of the district is Hasbaya.

Gallery 

 
Districts of Lebanon